"California Saga/California" is a song by American rock band the Beach Boys from their January 1973 album Holland. It was written by Al Jardine and is the third and final part of the "California Saga" series of songs on Holland. In May 1973, a remixed version was issued as a single under the title "California Saga (On My Way To Sunny Californ-i-a)".

Recording
"California" features Brian Wilson – who was otherwise barely present at the Holland sessions – singing the opening line "On my way to sunny Californ-i-a". Jardine remembered, "We came down to the studio to do a mix-down so [Brian] could get home. Then suddenly, [he] came in and said, 'Give me a microphone.' He walked straight in. I hadn't seen him for a month. He walked up to the microphone and started singing, 'I'm on my way to sunny Califon-i-a.' He then left the microphone and walked out." Wilson corroborated this story, also dubbing the track a song to "lift your spirits up."

Former Beach Boy Bruce Johnston, who had officially left the band several months earlier, explained in a 2013 interview, "I had to secretly come down and do vocals. Al told me, 'I've got this track 'California Saga' and I want you to sing on it.' That's a cool track and I sang background on that uncredited."

Single release
In the UK, "California Saga/California" (backed with "Sail On, Sailor") was issued in February 1973 as the lead single from Holland, reaching number 75. Biographer Mark Dillon surmised that Jardine's song was chosen as a single because his 1970 production of "Cotton Fields" had been the band's last hit there.

In March 1973, the band remixed and overdubbed new vocals onto "California Saga/California" for a U.S. single release. Released in May, the single (backed with "Funky Pretty") reached number 84.

Personnel
Credits from Craig Slowinski, John Brode, Will Crerar and Joshilyn Hoisington

The Beach Boys
Blondie Chaplin - electric guitar (w/ wah-wah pedal)
Ricky Fataar - drums, pedal steel guitar
Al Jardine - backing vocals, banjos, electric 12-string guitar, producer
Mike Love - lead and backing vocals
Brian Wilson - intro vocal
Carl Wilson - backing vocals, Hammond B-3 organ, Moog synthesizer (bass)

Additional musicians
Bruce Johnston - backing vocals
Charles Lloyd - flute
Frank Mayes - baritone saxophone, horn arrangement
Unknown musicians - tenor saxophone, 2 trumpets, diatonic harmonica

References
Citations

Bibliography
 
 

1973 songs
The Beach Boys songs
Jan and Dean songs
Songs written by Al Jardine
Song recordings produced by Al Jardine
Songs about California